Newtownabbey Community High School was a secondary school in Newtownabbey, Northern Ireland.

Newtownabbey Community High School, founded in 1994, was a controlled, co-educational school providing secondary level education for girls and boys of all ability levels.  The school occupied spacious buildings on a mature wooded site and its location on the Shore Road at Whitehouse allows easy access on foot, and by public transport from the Greater Newtownabbey area, Greenisland and Belfast.

School in the community
The school had become an important part of the surrounding community and the greatest majority of adolescents from the near Rathcoole (Newtownabbey) Estate attended the school.
The School had donated a section of the building to keep the neighbouring Whitehouse Primary School running until the School was rebuilt due to being demolished after an arson attack.

Newtownabbey Community High School, also had an arson attack on 30 July 2006 which destroyed the Music classroom and the Special Needs classroom causing a lot of smoke damage to the Assembly Hall and the other classrooms. The fire at NCHS celebrated its 10th Anniversary in July 2016,

Curriculum
In line with the Northern Ireland Education Order, Newtownabbey Community High School offered each child a broad and balanced curriculum. Key Stage 3 offered a wide range of subjects including : Mathematics, Technology, Science, Music, Languages (French and Spanish), English, Learning for Life & Work, PSHE (Personal, Social and Health Education), ICT, Physical Education, Art, Home Economics, Religious Education, History, Geography, Drama, and the school also contained a Hair Salon which was operated by students.

With Key Stage 4 and GCSE the School also supported a Careers Experience programme in which pupils could get experience by working a 1 week long apprenticeship or if they chose the Army they would get 1 week in the Military then they would be able to do an apprenticeship for the following week.

Pastoral care
Each pupil had a Form Tutor who dealt with day-to-day matters, and each year group had a Key Stage Head responsible for general welfare and guidance.  Parents could discuss their child's progress and receive information through regular evening meetings with Subject Teachers, Form Tutors and Key Stage Heads.  Individual interviews with Key Stage Heads, Vice-Principal or Principal could also be arranged.

Extracurricular activities
Activities and clubs include Art Club, Choir, Craft Club, Educational trips to Europe, Environmental Club and Scripture Union, Sports activities include Athletics, Badminton, Basketball, Fitness Training, Football (Girls and Boys), Hockey, Netball, Rugby, and Swimming.  A supervised Homework Club also operated, and there were many after-school GCSE classes.

Closed
Newtownabbey Community High School closed in August 2015 to merge with Monkstown Community School. The new school is called Abbey Community College.

References

Secondary schools in County Antrim
School buildings in the United Kingdom destroyed by arson
Defunct schools in Northern Ireland